Jerry Belmontes (born December 4, 1988 in Corpus Christi, Texas) is an American former professional boxer who competed from 2008 to 2016. He signed a multi-fight deal with Golden Boy Promotions in early 2013, and challenged for the WBC lightweight title in 2014.

Amateur career
Belmontes won a gold medal in the 2002 National Silver Gloves at 95 lbs in the 12-13 age range. Two years later, he participated in the 2004 National Junior Olympics at 125 lbs. He also won gold in the 2007 United States under-19 championships at 132 lbs. Additionally, he was a semi finalist to qualify for the 2008 Summer Olympics.

Professional career
He made his pro debut against fellow 19-year-old Olvin Mejia in Brownsville, Texas on January 18, 2008, winning by way of unanimous decision. This was the start of a 17 fight win streak spanning almost three years. He was scheduled to face USBA Super bantamweight champion Teon Kennedy in December 2012, but Kennedy was forced to pull out due to an ankle injury. Instead, he fought Eric Hunter, and subsequently lost by way of unanimous decision in a televised 10-round fight on December 8, 2012 in Philadelphia.

Shortly thereafter, he was dropped from Main Events Boxing, only 10 months into a 3-year deal. His next schedule fight against former world featherweight contender Rocky Juarez was scrapped after negotiations fell through. He split his next two fights, before receiving his first title shot one year later. He faced Francisco Vargas for his NABF and WBO Inter-continental Super featherweight titles, and lost via unanimous decision on December 13, 2013 at the Fantasy Springs Casino in Indio, California.

In his next bout, he upset previously undefeated Will Tomlinson, a former IBO Super featherweight champion, by way of unanimous decision on March 8, 2014 on the Saúl Álvarez vs. Alfredo Angulo undercard at the MGM Grand in Las Vegas. On April 26, he fought Omar Figueroa for his WBC lightweight title in the opening bout of a Showtime tripleheader at the StubHub Center in Carson, California. Belmontes had previously beaten Figueroa three times in the amateur ranks, but lost this one by split decision.

He has since lost by decision to fellow contenders Abner Cotto and Miguel Vázquez.

Personal life
His father, Sal Belmontes, is his trainer. Sal went 3-1 as a professional in the 1980s. Additionally, his brother, Steve Belmontes, is also a professional boxer, with a 2-0 record.

Professional boxing record

| style="text-align:center;" colspan="8"|21 Wins (6 knockouts, 14 decisions),  9 Losses (1 knockouts, 8 decisions), 0 Draws
|-  style="text-align:center; background:#e3e3e3;"
|  style="border-style:none none solid solid; "|Res.
|  style="border-style:none none solid solid; "|Record
|  style="border-style:none none solid solid; "|Opponent
|  style="border-style:none none solid solid; "|Type
|  style="border-style:none none solid solid; "|Rd., Time
|  style="border-style:none none solid solid; "|Date
|  style="border-style:none none solid solid; "|Location
|  style="border-style:none none solid solid; "|Notes
|- align=center
|Loss
|align=center|21-9||align=left| Richar Abril
|
|
|
|align=left|
|align=left|
|- align=center
|Win
|align=center|21-8||align=left| Valentyn Golovko
|
|
|
|align=left|
|align=left|
|- align=center
|Win
|align=center|20-8||align=left| Jerron Lockette
|
|
|
|align=left|
|align=left|
|- align=center
|Loss
|align=center|19-8||align=left| Jason Sosa
|
|
|
|align=left|
|align=left|
|- align=center
|Loss
|align=center|19-7||align=left| Dierry Jean
|
|
|
|align=left|
|align=left|
|- align=center
|Loss
|align=center|19-6||align=left| Miguel Vázquez
|
|
|
|align=left|
|align=left|
|- align=center
|Loss
|align=center|19-5||align=left| Abner Cotto
|
|
|
|align=left|
|align=left|
|- align=center
|Loss
|align=center|19-4||align=left| Omar Figueroa
|
|
|
|align=left|
|align=left|
|- align=center
|Win
|align=center|19-3||align=left| Will Tomlinson
|
|
|
|align=left|
|align=left|
|- align=center
|Loss
|align=center|18-3||align=left| Francisco Vargas
|
|
|
|align=left|
|align=left|
|- align=center
|Loss
|align=center|18-2||align=left| Andrew Cancio
|
|
|
|align=left|
|align=left|
|- align=center
|Win
|align=center|18-1||align=left| Daniel Díaz
|
|
|
|align=left|
|align=left|
|- align=center
|Loss
|align=center|17-1||align=left| Eric Hunter
|
|
|
|align=left|
|align=left|
|- align=center
|Win
|align=center|17–0||align=left| Joselito Collado
|
|
|
|align=left|
|align=left|
|- align=center
|Win
|align=center|16–0||align=left| Ramesis Gil
|
|
|
|align=left|
|align=left|
|- align=center
|Win
|align=center|15–0||align=left| Justo Vallecillo
|
|
|
|align=left|
|align=left|
|- align=center
|Win
|align=center|14–0||align=left| Eddie Ramírez
|
|
|
|align=left|
|align=left|
|- align=center
|Win
|align=center|13–0||align=left| Arturo Herrera
|
|
|
|align=left|
|align=left|
|- align=center
|Win
|align=center|12–0||align=left| Gil García
|
|
|
|align=left|
|align=left|
|- align=center
|Win
|align=center|11–0||align=left| Morris Chule
|
|
|
|align=left|
|align=left|
|- align=center
|Win
|align=center|10–0||align=left| Adauto González
|
|
|
|align=left|
|align=left|
|- align=center
|Win
|align=center|9–0||align=left| Tommy Atencio
|
|
|
|align=left|
|align=left|
|- align=center
|Win
|align=center|8–0||align=left| Juan Velásquez
|
|
|
|align=left|
|align=left|
|- align=center
|Win
|align=center|7–0||align=left| Richard Flores
|
|
|
|align=left|
|align=left|
|- align=center
|Win
|align=center|6–0||align=left| Jesús Hernández
|
|
|
|align=left|
|align=left|
|- align=center
|Win
|align=center|5–0||align=left| Guadalupe de Leon
|
|
|
|align=left|
|align=left|
|- align=center
|Win
|align=center|4–0||align=left| Jairo Delgado
|
|
|
|align=left|
|align=left|
|- align=center
|Win
|align=center|3–0||align=left| Martin Armenta
|
|
|
|align=left|
|align=left|
|- align=center
|Win
|align=center|2–0||align=left| Angel Rosado
|
|
|
|align=left|
|align=left|
|- align=center
|Win
|align=center|1–0|| align=left| Olvin Mejía
|
|||
|align=left|
|align=left|

References

External links
 

1988 births
Living people
American male boxers
Boxers from Texas
Featherweight boxers
Super-featherweight boxers
Lightweight boxers
Sportspeople from Corpus Christi, Texas